Philippus of Chollidae was Plato's neighbor. He lived to the west of Plato's Iphistiadae estate.

References
 Diogenes Laërtius, Life of Plato. Translated by C.D. Yonge.

Year of birth unknown
Ancient Greeks
Family of Plato